A jaleo is a chorus in flamenco in which dancers and the singer clap.

More particularly, in flamenco jaleo includes words of encouragement called out to the performers, as individuals or as a group, as well as hand-clapping. Among common jaleo shouts to cheer on the singers, the guitarists or the dancers, are olé and así se canta or así se baila ("that's the way to sing," or "that's the way to dance"). Done to accompany the rhythm of the music, it may constitute an integral part of the flamenco art. The clapping can be done with cupped hands which makes a hollow sound (sordas), or a staccato effect can be produced with stiff fingers striking the palm of the other hand (altas). In addition, finger-snapping (pitos), feet stomping done when seated, and clicking sounds are used. 

"Three good jaleadores (performers of jaleo) can sound like ten. One will carry the rhythm, another the counter-rhythm, and the third will weave in and about the jaleo of the other two."

Lively and spontaneous, it may sound commonplace, yet jaleo is "a science in itself" which requires "extensive training". Jaleadores perform on stage and in recording studios, and form a "necessary and intricate component of flamenco" performance. Proof of this claim is the fact that some albums reference the jaleadores along with the singers and guitarists in its liner notes.

References

Flamenco